Savona is a seaport and comune in the west part of the northern Italian region of Liguria, capital of the Province of Savona, in the Riviera di Ponente on the Mediterranean Sea. Savona is the main center of the Italian Riviera.

One of the most celebrated former inhabitants of Savona was the navigator Christopher Columbus, who farmed land in the area while chronicling his journeys. 'Columbus's house', a cottage situated in the Savona hills, lay between vegetable crops and fruit trees. It is one of several residences in Liguria associated with Columbus.

History
Inhabited in ancient times by Ligures tribes, it came under Roman influence in  180 BC, after the Punic wars in which the city had been allied to Carthage. At the fall of the Western Roman Empire, it passed under Lombard rule in 641 AD (being destroyed in the attack) after a short period as an Ostrogoth and then Byzantine possession. Later it recovered as county seat in the Carolingian Empire. In the 10th century its bishops were counts of Savona, but later the countship passed to the marquesses of Montferrat (981) and afterwards to the marquesses Del Vasto (1084).

After a long struggle against the Saracens, Savona acquired independence in the 11th century, becoming a free municipality allied with the Emperor. Savona was the center of religious culture (13th to 16th centuries) due to the work of two important monasteries: Dominican and Franciscan. Subsequently, it fought against Genoa before being definitively conquered in 1528. The Genoese destroyed the upper town and buried the port. It then shared the fortunes of the Republic of Genoa until Napoleonic times. In 1809 the city received Pope Pius VII, prisoner of Napoleon Bonaparte, for a few years. Between April and mid-May 1800, Austrian forces besieged the city while a small British naval force maintained a blockade; the fortress surrendered on 15 May. Subsequently, Savona was annexed to the Kingdom of Sardinia-Piedmont (1815). Eventually, it became part of unified Italy.

Main sights

Churches
 The Cattedrale dell'Assunta (Cathedral of the Assumption), built after Genoese demolition of the old cathedral. It kept the relics of Saint Valentine.
 The Cappella Sistina (Sistine Chapel), adjacent to the cathedral and built 1480–1483, it containing the Mausoleum erected by the Della Rovere Pope Sixtus IV to honor his parents, Leonardo Della Rovere and Luchina Monleone. The construction was commissioned by Giovanni D'Aria and his brother Michele. The chapel is architecturally similar to the chapel dedicated to the Cardinal Pietro Riario in the Basilica of the Santi Apostoli, Rome. After years of deterioration, in 1765-1767 a reconstruction was ordered by the Genovese Doge Francesco Maria Della Rovere. This updated the chapel in a Rococo style, with ceiling painted by Paolo Gerolamo Brusco. The cathedral has a noteworthy 16th-century carved wooden choir seats.
 The church of Nostra Signora di Castello (Our Lady of the Castle) has a large altarpiece by Vincenzo Foppa and Ludovico Brea painted in 1490.
 The Sanctuary of Nostra Signora della Misericordia (Our Lady of Mercy).

Towers and fortress
 The Torre Leon Pancaldo (Leon Pancaldo Tower), built in the 14th century and also known as "Torretta", is the symbol of the town.
 The Torre del Brandale (Brandale Tower), also known as Campanassa (Commune tower, where the freedom declaration of Savona was signed in 1191) and towers Corsi and Riario.
 The Priamar fortress, built by the Genoese in 1542 after their conquest of Savona, on the area of the old cathedral and old city and later used as a prison and military prison. In 1830-1831 Giuseppe Mazzini was imprisoned in the fortress and he "dreams" the "Giovine Italia". Inside the fortress there is the Museum Centre of Priamar.

Palaces and others 
 The Palazzo Della Rovere (Della Rovere Palace), built by Cardinal Giulio della Rovere (future Pope Julius II) and designed by Giuliano da Sangallo as a university.
 The Palazzo Gavotti (Gavotti Palace), built in the 15th century. Inside the palace there is the Art Museum of Palazzo Gavotti that contains the Pinacoteca of Savona, the artwork of Fondazione Museo di Arte Contemporanea Milena Milani in memoria di Carlo Cardazzo and the Ceramic Museum.
 The Palazzo Delle Piane (Delle Piane Palace), an important building in Liberty style of Savona.
 The Villa Zanelli, an important Liberty-style former residence and hospital.
 In neighbourhood of Savona remains a house documented as property of Domenico Colombo, father of Christopher Columbus, where they lived for many years (Christopher Columbus lived in Savona for much of his youth).
 The War Memorial, with a marble base and bronze figures, was created by sculptor Luigi Venzano. It was inaugurated on 18 September 1927 and since then every day at 18:00 in Piazza Goffredo Mameli the fallen of all wars are commemorated with 21 tolls of the bell, one for each letter of the Italian alphabet: during the tolling traffic and pedestrians stop as a sign of respect.

Geography

Climate
Savona has a borderline humid subtropical (Cfa) and Mediterranean climate (Csa).

Generally, a typical summer season lasts about 4 to 6 months, from May/June to September/October. The daily temperature range is limited, with an average range of about 7 °C (13 °F) between high and low temperatures. Rain occurs mainly in autumn, the summers being generally dry. Sunshine hours total above 2,097 per year, from an average 4 hours of sunshine duration per day in winter to average 9 hours in summer. Savona usually sees snow once or twice per year.

Government

People

 Paolo Boselli (1838–1932), Prime Minister of Italy during World War I
 Gianni Baget Bozzo (born 1925), priest and politician
 Susanna Bonfiglio (born 1974), basketball player
 Carlo Aonzo (born 1967), classical mandolinist and composer
 Giacomo Boselli (1744-1808), Rococo-period sculptor of ceramics
 Elenoire Casalegno (born 1976), actress and TV host
 Luis Fernando Centi (born 1976), footballer
 Gabriello Chiabrera (1552–1638), poet
 Christopher Columbus (c. 1450–1506), explorer
 Enrico Cucchi (1965–1996), footballer
 Renato Dossena (born 1987), footballer
 Giulia Dotta (born 1992), professional dancer
 Fabio Fazio (born 1964), TV host
 Giuseppe Ferrerio (1554–1610), Roman Catholic archbishop
 Luca Ferro (born 1978), footballer
 Nando Gazzolo (1928-2015), actor
 Orazio Grassi (1583-1654), astronomer
 Bartolomeo Guidobono (1654–1709), painter
 Domenico Guidobono (1668-1746), painter
 Pope Julius II (Albisola 1443–1513)
 Michele Marcolini (born 1975), footballer
 Maria Christina of Naples and Sicily (1779–1849), Queen of Sardinia, died in Savona
 Leon Pancaldo (1488 or 1490–1538), explorer
 Christian Panucci (born 1973), footballer
 Sandro Pertini (1896 – 1990) President of the Italian Republic
 Daniela Poggi (born 1956), actress
 Girolamo Riario (1443–1488), lord of Imola and Forlì and one of the plotters behind the 1478 Pazzi Conspiracy
 Pietro Riario (1447–1474), cardinal and Papal diplomat
 Della Rovere noble family that flourished in the 15th century
 Annalisa Scarrone (born 5 August 1985), singer and songwriter
 Renata Scotto (born 1934), opera singer
 Stephan El Shaarawy (born 1992), footballer
 Pope Sixtus IV (Pecorile 1414 – 1484)
 Davide Biale (born 5 April 1994), YouTube personality and bassist

Events
 The Carnival, with a parade in the centre of the town, the typical costume of Savona is Cicciulin.
 The Patron saint's festival of Nostra Signora della Misericordia, on 18 March.
 The Holy Friday, with a spectacular procession in streets of the city which takes place every two years.
 The Santa Lucia fair in the central street of Via Paleocapa on 13 December.
 The Confuoco (in local dialect U Confeugu), it takes place the last Sunday before Christmas in the square of Sisto IV.

Twin towns and sister cities

Savona is twinned with:
  Villingen-Schwenningen, Germany
  Saona, Dominican Republic
  Bayamo, Cuba
  Mariupol, Ukraine

See also
 Corale Alpina Savonese
 Savona Football Club
 Nemo's Garden (Noli)

References

Sources

External links

 Genoa Airport :: What to see :: Varazze
 Savona Web
 Confrateernita di S. Domenico

 
Cities and towns in Liguria
Coastal towns in Liguria
Municipalities of the Province of Savona
Italian Riviera
Mediterranean port cities and towns in Italy
Baroque architecture in Liguria